Greed is the third studio album by American experimental rock band Swans. It was released in 1986, through record label K.422. Greed marks the slow turning point for Swans away from the harsh, brutal noise rock of prior releases, and is also the first Swans album to contain contributions from Jarboe.

Background 
Certain tracks utilize drum machines. The lead instrument on "Fool" is a grand piano. "Money Is Flesh" uses a synthesizer.

The first CD issue contained the "Time Is Money (Bastard)" single as bonus tracks. A later compilation released in 1992, Greed / Holy Money, combined Greed (barring "Fool" and "Money Is Flesh", however "Fool (#2)" and "Money Is Flesh (#2)" were listed as these, respectively) and Holy Money (barring "A Screw (Holy Money)", though "A Screw (Holy Money) (Mix)" was listed as this), as well as the entirety of the A Screw EP and an abridged version of "Time Is Money (Bastard) (Mix)" (listed as "Time Is Money (Bastard)") from the "Time Is Money (Bastard)" single. This compilation, with its entirely re-organized track list, saw re-issue in 1999 in the double-disc set Cop/Young God / Greed/Holy Money, which included the Cop album and Young God EP.

Critical reception
The New York Times wrote that "some [songs] are dominated by the hammer-on-anvil chording of the guitarist Norman Westberg, while others feature a welter of chanting voices and sound like some sinister religious ritual." Trouser Press called Greed the album "where everything finally jells," writing that "each track is a complete work in itself, enthralling and narcotizing." The Quietus deemed it "intense bleakness with power plant rhythms, tougher than concrete wrapped in leather."

Track listing

Personnel 

 Michael Gira – vocals, samples, tape operation, piano, bass guitar, production, album cover design
 Jarboe – backing vocals
 Norman Westberg – guitar
 Harry Crosby – bass guitar
 Ronaldo Gonzalez – drums
 Ted Parsons – drums
 Ivan Nahem – drums
Technical
 Estabon – production assistance
 Jorgé Estabon – engineering
 P. White – album cover artwork

Charts

References

External links 

 

Greed
1986 albums
Albums produced by Michael Gira